Diana Margaret Silvers (born November 3, 1997) is an American actress, best known for playing Erin Naird in the series Space Force.

Early life 
Silvers was born in Los Angeles, the fifth of six children born to a Swiss mother and a Jewish American father. Silvers began attending theatre camps at age 12 after watching the film What's Eating Gilbert Grape, and decided to pursue a career in acting. Silvers attended the Palisades Charter High School where she pursued tennis. She attended New York University to study acting but changed her major to history with a minor in film. She dropped out of college during her junior year.

Career

Acting 
Silvers made her acting debut in an episode of the Hulu thriller series Into the Dark (2018–present) and proceeded to appear in M. Night Shyamalan's film Glass (2019). She auditioned for the horror film Ma (2019) while in college, and got the role despite believing she had botched her audition. In Ma, she portrays Maggie, whose friends befriend the main character who soon begins terrorizing them. Silvers got the script for Booksmart (2019) while filming Ma and was initially asked to audition for the main character's crush, but auditioned for the character of Hope instead. In October 2018, it was reported that Silvers had been cast in the action movie Eve, later re-titled Ava. In September 2019, it was announced that Silvers was cast as Erin Naird in the Netflix comedy series Space Force (2020–2022). She also stars in Sarah Adina Smith's 2021 film Birds of Paradise for Amazon.

Modeling 
Silvers was scouted by IMG Models via their "We Love Your Genes" account on Instagram in her senior year of high school after being accepted into NYU, and continued modeling through school to pay for her studies. In 2019, she closed Stella McCartney's Autumn show.

Filmography 
Film

Television

References

External links 

 

1997 births
Living people
Actresses from California
American film actresses
American people of Jewish descent
American people of Swiss descent
American television actresses
21st-century American actresses
Female models from California
IMG Models models